The 1996 European Beach Volleyball Championships were held in August, 1996 in Pescara, Italy. It was the fourth official edition of the men's event, which started in 1993, while the women competed for the third time.

Men's competition

Women's competition

References
 Results

1996
E
B
B